Visine, also known as Vispring, is a brand of eye drops produced by Johnson & Johnson. Visine was first introduced under Pfizer in 1999 as a lubricant to temporarily relieve eye irritation. In 2006, Johnson & Johnson acquired Visine, along with Pfizer's entire consumer healthcare portfolio. The original formulation of Visine includes the active ingredient tetrahydrozoline hydrochloride, which is a vasoconstrictor that constricts the eye's superficial blood vessels to temporarily reduce eye redness.

Products
In addition to its original formulation, Visine is available in several varieties of eye drops for different types of eye irritation. These include formulas with antihistamines for allergy-induced irritation, to moisturizing formulations for eye dryness. These formulations use active ingredients ranging from oxymetazoline to naphazoline. Some Visine products cater specifically to contact lens wearers or to those who require artificial tears.

Side effects

Adverse effects
Visine has been observed to cause stinging and burning upon application, and has a rebound effect that may cause eye redness to worsen. Prolonged use has been observed to cause blood vessels to be dilated for an extended period of time. Because of this risk, Visine usage has been recommended to be limited, unless specified by a doctor. Some formulations of Visine are not advised for contact lens wearers as the decreased blood flow to counter eye redness could further lower oxygen levels to the eye. Some Visine products are not recommended to be used by patients with glaucoma, since stimulation from lubrication can contribute to high pressure within the eye. Certain underlying health conditions that cause eye irritation are not able to be relieved by Visine and require prescription-grade eye drops.

Ingestion 
A debunked urban legend claims that a few drops of Visine will cause harmless but debilitating bouts of explosive diarrhea, similar to a laxative.  However, symptoms of Visine's active ingredient tetrahydrozoline hydrochloride can be severe, and can include:
Dangerously low body temperature (hypothermia)
Blurred vision
Nausea and vomiting
Difficulty breathing or cessation of breathing
Elevated blood pressure (hypertension) followed by sudden low blood pressure (hypotension) 
Coma
Seizures and tremors
Death
Oral ingestion of Visine warrants immediate medical attention or a call to a poison control center.

Criminal use 
There have been multiple high-profile murder cases that have been alleged to utilize Visine's active ingredient tetrahydrozoline hydrochloride as a poison. In 2018, a South Carolina nurse was accused of killing her husband by adding Visine to his drinks over a period of three days. In 2019, a North Carolina paramedic was similarly accused of murdering his wife, with Visine misuse asserted as the probable cause.

Popular culture
In the film Wedding Crashers, the character Sack Lodge, portrayed by Bradley Cooper, is drugged with Visine eye drops, and is depicted as having severe gastrointestinal upset afterwards. The character John Beckwith, portrayed by Owen Wilson, uses Visine several times over the course of the film to feign crying. The movie gained notoriety for misrepresenting the effects of Visine consumption, which in actuality can be lethal.

The urban legend about Visine inducing severe diarrhea is perpetuated in the film I Hope They Serve Beer in Hell. In the movie, the main character Tucker Max, portrayed by Matt Czuchry, offends two women at a bar, prompting one of the women to squirt Visine into his beer bottle without his knowledge. After consuming the drugged liquid, Tucker, and another character, are then depicted as having severe diarrhea.

In Season 4, Episode 3 of Orange Is the New Black, an inmate poisons a fellow inmate using Visine, and the poisoned inmate is depicted as experiencing severe diarrhea shortly after.

In Season 3, Episode 19 of Glee, a punch bowl is implied to be spiked with Visine by the character Sue Sylvester, portrayed by Jane Lynch.

References

External links
Visine webpage
Snopes reference

Ophthalmology drugs
Johnson & Johnson brands